Amal Dutta (born 12 August 1933, in Calcutta, Bengal Presidency) was a member of 7th Lok Sabha from Diamond Harbour (Lok Sabha constituency) in West Bengal State, India.

He was elected to the 8th, 9th and 10th Lok Sabha from Diamond Harbour.

He died on 20 October 2017 at Kolkata.

References

1933 births
2017 deaths
Politicians from Kolkata
India MPs 1980–1984
India MPs 1984–1989
India MPs 1989–1991
India MPs 1991–1996
People from Kolkata district
West Bengal politicians
Lok Sabha members from West Bengal